The W-1 was a class of electric locomotive used by the Great Northern Railway.  They were constructed to haul trains on the  electrified portion of the railroad across the Cascade Mountains from Wenatchee, Washington to Skykomish, Washington, including the Cascade Tunnel. Only two locomotives were built, and they had an AAR B-D+D-B wheel arrangements.  

The locomotives were built at General Electric's Erie works in 1947, and were numbered 5018 and 5019.  They were powered by 2 W-1 motor-generators, with a total  , and at that time were the largest single-unit electric locomotives used in North America. The engines share a great resemblance to the Little Joe locomotive.

Both locomotives were retired in August 1956 when the electrification system was switched off and diesel locomotives started operating. Unit 5019 was scrapped in 1959. Unit 5018 was sold to the Union Pacific, who used its body and running gear as part of the unsuccessful experimental coal burning turbine-electric locomotive #80. It was eventually scrapped in 1968.

References

 
 
 
 
 

Great Northern Railway (U.S.)
11 kV AC locomotives
W-1
General Electric locomotives
Scrapped locomotives
B-D+D-B Locomotives
Electric locomotives of the United States
Railway locomotives introduced in 1947
Streamlined_electric_locomotives